is the sixth studio album by Swedish singer Håkan Hellström, released on 13 October 2010. It was produced by Håkan Hellström in collaboration with Joakim Åhlund. Many of the songs were written together with The Soundtrack of our Lives' guitarist Björn Olsson, who also produced Hellström's third studio album Ett kolikbarns bekännelser. A double A-side single featuring "Saknade te havs" and "River en vacker dröm" was released prior to the album, on 11 September. "River en vacker dröm" was originally meant to be performed at 2010's edition of Way Out West only. However, nearing the release of the album, Hellström chose to record it as well.

Track listing

Charts
The album debuted at number one on the Swedish Albums Chart. It also entered the Norwegian Albums Chart at number four.

Weekly charts

Year-end charts

References

2010 albums
Håkan Hellström albums
Swedish-language albums
Universal Music Group albums
Albums produced by Joakim Åhlund